Aaron Michael Carotta (born November 18, 1977) known as Adventure Aaron, is an American television personality, travel blogger, and former news reporter. Carotta has previously been a morning live reporter for WLUV TV6.

Career
Carotta was born in Louisiana on 18 November 1977.

2010–2015: Early television career 
Carotta has been producing his own television shows since 2010.

2018: WLUC TV6 
Throughout 2018, Carrota was a morning live reporter for WLUC TV 6. He left in August 2018.

Bibliography
Catch and Cook (2013)

Filmography
 Alive! with Adventure Aaron (2010)
 Bucket Wish (2012)
 Catch and Cook with Adventure Aaron (2012–2014)
 Finding the Current (2018)

References

External links 

 
 

1977 births
Living people
American television hosts
21st-century American writers